Matias Nicolás Leonel Ballini (born 19 December 1988) is an Argentine professional footballer who plays as midfielder for Cobreloa.

References

External links
 Profile at De Central
 
 
 

1988 births
Living people
People from Campana, Buenos Aires
Association football midfielders
Argentine footballers
Argentine expatriate footballers
Villa Dálmine footballers
Rosario Central footballers
Girona FC players
Atlético Tucumán footballers
Club Atlético Colón footballers
Independiente Santa Fe footballers
Cobreloa footballers
San Martín de Tucumán footballers
Argentine Primera División players
Primera Nacional players
Segunda División players
Categoría Primera A players
Primera B de Chile players
Argentine expatriate sportspeople in Chile
Argentine expatriate sportspeople in Spain
Argentine expatriate sportspeople in Colombia
Expatriate footballers in Chile
Expatriate footballers in Spain
Expatriate footballers in Colombia
Sportspeople from Buenos Aires Province